The Mundaring Branch Railway is a historical section of the original Eastern Railway main line across the Darling Scarp in the Western Australian Government Railways (WAGR) system.

Name variation 
It has had a number of names in WAGR records – including:

 Smiths Mill Line (locality later known as Glen Forrest) after the Eastern Railway was moved to the new line to the north – 1890s to 1920s
 The Mundaring Loop, or Mundaring Line – 1930s to 1950s

There was confusion in the naming of the Mahogany Creek Deviation. The Mahogany Creek railway stopping place was on the Mundaring Branch Railway between Glen Forrest and Mundaring. However the Mahogany Creek Deviation was the incorrect name for the new line that followed the line of the Jane Brook to Mount Helena. It was on the second route of the Eastern Railway constructed in the 1880s to early 1890s, and it passed through the Swan View Tunnel, well to the north of the original Mahogany Creek stopping place and the creek itself.

Connections 
The Branch commenced at Bellevue railway station, moving up the slope to Greenmount.
Steep gradients and deviation inclines occurred through to Glen Forrest.

It connected with the newer line at Mount Helena.

Mundaring was the junction point where the Mundaring Weir Branch Railway commenced.

Timetabled passenger services on this branch (until closure in early 1954) tended to terminate at Sawyers Valley.

Closure 
Traffic ceased running in 1954; the line was closed by Parliament in 1966.

Following closure, it eventually became part of the Railway Reserve Heritage Trail.

Stopping places and sidings
 Bellevue
 Greenmount
 Greenmount Quarry siding
 Mountain Quarry siding
 Boya
 Hudman Road Quarry siding
 Darlington
 Glen Forrest (originally Smith's Mill)
 Statham Brickworks Siding
 Nyaannia
 Zamia (highest point on line at 1,007 feet)
 Mundaring
 Mundaring Weir line just outside Mundaring railway yard
 Sawyers Valley
 Mount Helena

References

Further reading 

 
 Elliot, Ian  Mundaring a History of the Shire. 1983.   
 Quinlan, Howard & Newland, John R.  Australian Railway Routes 1854-2000  2000. 
 Watson, Lindsay The Railway History of Midland Junction. 1995.  

Closed railway lines in Western Australia
Shire of Mundaring
Eastern Railway (Western Australia)
Railway lines closed in 1954